

The Great American Hall of Wonders was an exhibition and catalog organized in 2011 by the Smithsonian American Art Museum. The exhibit explored a number of themes pertinent to 19th century United States: clocks, Niagara Falls, guns, buffalos, railroads, and "big trees." Works displayed included patent illustrations, advertisements, and artworks.

List of artists
Among the artists, illustrators, photographers and inventors exhibited:

 John James Audubon
 John James Barralet
 Albert Bierstadt
 Richard Norris Brooke
 George Catlin
 Frederic Edwin Church
 James Goodwyn Clonney
 Thomas Cole
 Jasper Francis Cropsey
 Currier and Ives
 Ferdinand Danton Jr.
 Felix Octavius Carr Darley
 Joseph H. Davis
 Charles Deas
 Thomas Doughty
 Robert S. Duncanson
 Asher B. Durand
 Thomas Eakins
 Francis William Edmonds
 John Whetton Ehninger
 Alvan Fisher
 James Gardner
 Ernest Griset
 William Michael Harnett
 Robert Havell
 Martin Johnson Heade
 Thomas Hill
 Winslow Homer
 Daniel Huntington
 George Inness
 Augustus Koch
 John Lewis Krimmel
 Arthur Lumley
 Thomas Moran
 Samuel Finley Breese Morse
 William Sidney Mount
 Eadweard Muybridge
 Thomas Nast
 William Notman
 Bass Otis
 Charles Willson Peale
 Raphaelle Peale
 Henry Cheever Pratt
 William Ranney
 John Rapkin
 Andrew Joseph Russell
 F.L. Seitz
 Lilly Martin Spencer
 John Mix Stanley
 Eli Terry
 John Trumbull
 Elihu Vedder
 Carleton Watkins
 Alexander Wilson
 Henry Worrall
 Thomas Worth

References

Further reading
 The Art Newspaper, July 2011, "The Great American Hall of Wonders" by Javier Pes
 Washingtonian, July 2011, "'Hall of Wonders' Opens at the Smithsonian American Art Museum" by Sophie Gilbert
 Inventors Digest, July 2011, "Welcome to the U.S. Hall of Wonders"
 NPR, Weekend Edition, July 17, 2011, "'Hall Of Wonders' Explores U.S. Innovation" with Linda Wertheimer
 BBC, July 21, 2011, "Can America's genius for invention endure?" by Jane O'Brien
 The Washington Post, July 24, 2011, "Smithsonian's 'Great American Hall of Wonders' is a missed opportunity" by Philip Kennicott
 The New York Times, July 28, 2011, "The World as America Dreamed It" by Edward Rothstein

External links
 Exhibit website

2011 non-fiction books
History books about the United States
Smithsonian Institution exhibitions
Smithsonian Institution publications
2011 in Washington, D.C.